"Bad Moon Rising" is a song written by John Fogerty and performed by Creedence Clearwater Revival. It was the lead single from their album Green River and was released in April 16, 1969 four months before the album. The song peaked at No. 2 on the Billboard Hot 100 chart on 28 June 1969 and reached No. 1 on the UK Singles Chart for three weeks in September of that year (see 1969 in music). It was CCR's second gold single.

The song has been recorded by at least 20 different artists, in styles ranging from folk to reggae to psychedelic rock.

In 2010, Rolling Stone ranked it No. 364 on its "500 Greatest Songs of All Time" list.

It is one of five songs by the band that peaked at the No. 2 spot on the U.S. Billboard chart and didn't get to No. 1. It was blocked by "Love Theme from Romeo and Juliet" by Henry Mancini.

Composition 
"Bad Moon Rising" uses weather imagery to make the point that something bad is lurking "out there."

Fogerty reportedly wrote the song after watching the 1941 film The Devil and Daniel Webster. It was inspired by a scene in the film in which a hurricane destroys the crops of several farms, but spares those of Jabez Stone (James Craig), the character in the film who makes a deal with the devil in exchange for wealth. Fogerty claims the song is about "the apocalypse that was going to be visited upon us".  He also said that when the band was learning the song he recognized the dichotomy between the apocalyptic words and the happy melody.  He said "It wasn't until the band was learning the song that I realized the dichotomy.  Here you've got this song with all these hurricanes and blowing and raging ruin and all that, but it's 'I see a bad moon rising.' It's a happy-sounding tune, right?  It didn't bother me at the time."

Reception
Billboard described the single as being "loaded with rhythm and drive" and predicted that it "[couldn't] miss going
right to the top."  Cash Box described it as a "blazing bayou-rock outing" that is "louder and bolder" than the group's previous single "Proud Mary."  Cash Box ranked it as the No. 51 single of 1969.

Ultimate Classic Rock critic Cliff M. Junior rated "Bad Moon Rising" as Creedence Clearwater Revival's 5th greatest song, saying that "in a little more than two minutes, [Fogerty] unloads his mind and prompts you to think about what’s troubling you in your life."

Chart history

Weekly charts

Year-end charts

Certifications and sales

References

1969 singles
Songs written by John Fogerty
Creedence Clearwater Revival songs
Jerry Lee Lewis songs
John Fogerty songs
UK Singles Chart number-one singles
Irish Singles Chart number-one singles
Number-one singles in New Zealand
Number-one singles in South Africa
Rockabilly songs
Song recordings produced by John Fogerty
1969 songs
Fantasy Records singles
Songs about death

de:Green River (Album)#Bad Moon Rising